Karen Markosyan (born 23 October 1968) is a retired Armenian football midfielder.

Career statistics

International

References

1968 births
Living people
Soviet footballers
Armenian footballers
Soviet Armenians
FC Ararat Yerevan players
FC Kotayk Abovyan players
Zvartnots-AAL FC players
FK Köpetdag Aşgabat players
Association football midfielders
Armenia international footballers
Armenian expatriate footballers
Expatriate footballers in Germany
Armenian expatriate sportspeople in Germany
Expatriate footballers in Turkmenistan
Armenian expatriate sportspeople in Turkmenistan